Orpheus Gate (Orfeeva Porta \or-'fe-e-va 'por-ta\), also Orpheus Pass, is the 548 m high and 380 m wide pass in eastern Livingston Island in the South Shetland Islands, Antarctica, bounded by Pliska Ridge to the southeast and Burdick Ridge to the northwest, Huntress Glacier to the southwest and Perunika Glacier to the northeast.

The pass forms part of the overland routes from Hurd Peninsula via Willan Saddle, the southern foothills of Burdick South Peak, and Orpheus Gate to upper Perunika Glacier, Wörner Gap and Camp Academia area, upper Huron Glacier, Tangra Mountains and Bowles Ridge.

Orpheus, a name of world and national culture, was originally applied in 1995 to a nearby peak but, due to the priority of the existing British nameform Willan Nunatak, was subsequently transferred to the present feature.

Location

First crossed by the Bulgarian Kuzman Tuhchiev from St. Kliment Ohridski Base during the 1993/94 season.

Maps
 South Shetland Islands. Scale 1:200000 topographic map. DOS 610 Sheet W 62 60. Tolworth, UK, 1968.
 Islas Livingston y Decepción.  Mapa topográfico a escala 1:100000.  Madrid: Servicio Geográfico del Ejército, 1991.
 S. Soccol, D. Gildea and J. Bath. Livingston Island, Antarctica. Scale 1:100000 satellite map. The Omega Foundation, USA, 2004.
 L.L. Ivanov et al., Antarctica: Livingston Island and Greenwich Island, South Shetland Islands (from English Strait to Morton Strait, with illustrations and ice-cover distribution), 1:100000 scale topographic map, Antarctic Place-names Commission of Bulgaria, Sofia, 2005
 L.L. Ivanov. Antarctica: Livingston Island and Greenwich, Robert, Snow and Smith Islands. Scale 1:120000 topographic map. Troyan: Manfred Wörner Foundation, 2010.  (First edition 2009. )
 Antarctic Digital Database (ADD). Scale 1:250000 topographic map of Antarctica. Scientific Committee on Antarctic Research (SCAR). Since 1993, regularly upgraded and updated.
 L.L. Ivanov. Antarctica: Livingston Island and Smith Island. Scale 1:100000 topographic map. Manfred Wörner Foundation, 2017.

Notes

References
 Orpheus Pass. SCAR Composite Antarctic Gazetteer
 Bulgarian Antarctic Gazetteer. Antarctic Place-names Commission. (details in Bulgarian, basic data in English)

External links
 Orpheus Pass. Copernix satellite image

Tangra Mountains